Si-woo, also spelled Shi-woo, or See-woo, is a South Korean masculine given name. The meaning differs based on the hanja used to write each syllable of the name. There are 54 hanja with the reading "shi" and 60 hanja with the reading "woo" on the South Korean government's official list of hanja which may be registered for use in given names. Si-woo was among the top 5 most popular name for newborn boys in South Korea in 2011, 2013 and 2017.

People
People with this name include:

Song Si-woo (born 1993), South Korean football midfielder
Lee Si-woo (born 1994), South Korean volleyball player
Kim Si-woo (born 1995), South Korean golfer
Choi Si-woo (born 1996), South Korean sledge hockey player
Kim Si-woo (born 1997), South Korean footballer

Fictional characters
Fictional characters with this name include:

Jung Shi-woo, in 2009 South Korean television series Soul
Si-woo, in 2012 South Korean television series Dream High 2
Shi-woo, in 2013 South Korean television series The Blade and Petal
Shi-woo, in 2014 South Korean television series My Lovely Girl
Yoon Si-woo, in 2016 South Korean television series Moorim School
Hong Shi-woo, in 2020 South Korean television series 18 Again

See also
List of Korean given names

References

Korean masculine given names